was a Japanese politician who served as governor of Hiroshima Prefecture from 1904 to 1907. He was also governor of Fukushima Prefecture (1898–1900), Saitama Prefecture (1900–1902) and Shizuoka Prefecture (1902–1904). He was a recipient of the Order of the Rising Sun.

Governors of Hiroshima
1846 births
1921 deaths
Japanese Home Ministry government officials
Governors of Fukushima Prefecture
Governors of Saitama Prefecture
Governors of Shizuoka Prefecture
Recipients of the Order of the Rising Sun, 2nd class